Balard is the southwestern terminus of Line 8 of the Paris Métro. Since 2006, it has also been a stop on Île-de-France tramway Line 3a. Situated in the 15th arrondissement of Paris, it serves Parc André Citroën, as well as the Site Balard of the Ministry of the Armies.

History
The station was opened on 27 July 1937 as part of the extension of Line 8 from La Motte-Picquet – Grenelle. The Île-de-France tramway Line 3 (now 3a) stop opened on 16 December 2006 as part of the initial section of the line between Pont du Garigliano and Porte d'Ivry. The station is named after Place Balard, itself named after Antoine-Jérôme Balard, a French chemist and the discoverer of bromine.

In June 2015, an additional southern access point (exit 6, Rue Louis Armand) was opened in order to improve the connection with Île-de-France tramway Line 2 at its station Suzanne Lenglen, which is a 140m walk away from the new exit.

Station layout

Gallery

References

Paris Métro stations in the 15th arrondissement of Paris
Railway stations in France opened in 1937